General or Imad is a military rank used in Lebanon and Syria. It is the highest rank in Lebanon, held by the commander of the army, while it is immediately behind Colonel General and Field marshal in the Syrian Army.

References 

Military of Lebanon
Military ranks
Syrian military personnel